Naked and Sacred is Chynna Phillips' debut (and only) solo album, released on November 7, 1995. She was the only member of the pop group Wilson Phillips to remain on her label, EMI, after the group broke up in late 1992. The album didn't see strong sales, selling 22,000 copies in the United States according to Billboard.com, but received good reviews. Chynna co-wrote 9 of the album's 11 songs,  which featured productions from Rick Nowels, Glen Ballard (who produced the majority of Wilson Phillips' previous work), and Desmond Child. According to Phillips, she was offered $1 million to record a solo album for EMI, and was dropped shortly after due to the album's disappointing sales.

Three singles were commercially released from the album: "Naked and Sacred", "I Live for You" (which was featured in the end credits of the 1996 film Striptease starring Demi Moore), and "Just to Hear You Say That You Love Me" (written by Diane Warren, and later recorded as a duet by country music singers Faith Hill and Tim McGraw for Hill's 1998 album Faith). The album track "Remember Me" was released in promo form and sent to U.S. radio in 1996, but was never commercially released.

Track listing
"Naked and Sacred" – 4:13 (Rick Nowels, Chynna Phillips, Billy Steinberg)
"When 2000 Comes" – 4:44 (Phillips, Peter Lord Moreland)
"Remember Me" – 4:53 (Phillips, Nowels)
"I Live for You" – 3:47 (Phillips, Desmond Child)
"This Close" – 4:24 (Phillips, Child)
"Till the End" – 4:13 (Phillips, Patrick Leonard)
"Turn Around" – 4:08 (Stacey Piersa, Elliot Wolff)
"Just to Hear You Say That You Love Me" – 4:33 (Diane Warren)
"Follow Love Down" – 3:42 (Phillips, Glen Ballard)
"Jewel in My Crown" – 4:05 (Phillips, Child)
"Will You?" – 3:05 (Phillips)

Singles
Naked and Sacred (1995) CD single
 "Naked and Sacred" (Album Version) – 4:10
 "Naked and Sacred" (David Morales Radio Mix) – 4:04
 "Naked and Sacred" (David Morales Classic Club Mix) – 7:56
 "Follow Love Down" – 4:32

I Live for You (1996) CD single
 "I Live for You" – 3:47
 "Life Ain't No Dress Rehearsal" – 3:55

Remember Me (Promo Only) (1996) CD single
 "Remember Me" (Radio Edit) – 4:02

Just to Hear You Say That You Love Me (International release, 1996) CD single
 "Just to Hear You Say That You Love Me" (Album Version) – 4:33
 "Free This Feeling" – 4:31
 "Unfinished Business" – 3:57

Production and personnel
*Tracks 1 and 3 produced by Rick Nowels; track 1 co-produced by Billy Steinberg.  Track 1 recorded by Peter Lorimer, Steve MacMillan and Chris Garcia.  Track 3 recorded by John Ingoldsby.  Both songs mixed by Steve MacMillan.  Claude Gaudette: Drum Programming, Keyboards; Charlie Clouser: Drum Programming; Chris Garcia: Loops; Charles Judge: Keyboards; Rick Nowels: Keyboards, Acoustic Guitars; Rusty Anderson: Guitar and Bouzouki; Michael Landau, John Ingoldsby: Guitars; John Pierce, Paul Bushnell: Bass; Luis Conte: Percussion

*Track 2 produced by Peter Lord Moreland and V. Jeffrey Smith.  Recorded by V. Jeffrey Smith and Ron Banks, with assistance by Andrew Page.  Mixed by Ron Banks, with assistance by Andrew Page.  Peter Lord Moreland and V. Jeffrey Smith: Keyboards, Drum Programming; T-Bone Wolk: Guitars

*Tracks 4, 5, 8 and 10 produced by Desmond Child.  Tracks 4, 5 and 8 recorded by Mark Gruber.  Track 10 recorded by Matt Gruber.  Track 4 mixed by Michael Brauer.  Tracks 5, 8 and 10 mixed by David Thoener.  Lester Mendez, Jeffrey Vanston: Keyboards; Dan Warner, Toledo, Brian Adler: Guitars; Julio Fernandez: Bass; Curt Bisquera: Drums on tracks 4 and 5;  Andrea Byers, Assa Drori, Dennis Molchan, Dixie Blackstone, Elizabeth Baker, Elizabeth Wilson, Eve Sprecher, Irving Geller, Jennifer Woodward, Marc Sazer, Mark Baranov, Michele Richards, Miwako Watanabe, Pip Clarke-Ling, Barbra Porter, Gerj Garabedian, Robert Peterson, Bruce Dukov, Charles Everett, John Wittenberg, Joy Lyle, Karen Jones, Maria Newman, Mario De Leon, Michelle Richards, Rachel Robinson, Sheldon Sanov, Tamara Chang: Violin; Jerry Epstein, Margot MacLaine, Marilyn Baker, Rollice Dale, Denyse Buffum, Evan Wilson, Bob Becker, Scott Haupert: Viola

*Tracks 6 and 11 produced by Patrick Leonard.  Recorded by Jerry Jordan.  Mixed by David Thoener and Jerry Jordan.  Patrick Leonard: Keyboards; James Harrah: Guitars; Spencer Campbell: Bass; Brian MacLeod: Drums, Percussion; Luis Conte: Percussion; Strings contracted and arranged by Bill Meyers.

Charts and sales

References 

1995 debut albums
Albums produced by Glen Ballard
Albums produced by Rick Nowels
Albums produced by Desmond Child
Albums produced by Patrick Leonard
Chynna Phillips albums
EMI Records albums
Pop rock albums by American artists